Pollanisus calliceros is a moth of the family Zygaenidae. It is found in Australia in Tasmania, Victoria and New South Wales.

The length of the forewings is 6.5–8 mm for males. There is one generation with adults on wing in mid-summer.

Subspecies
Pollanisus calliceros calliceros Turner, 1926 (Tasmania, the mountains of Victoria and southernmost New South Wales)
Pollanisus calliceros azurea Tarmann, 2005 (mountains of central and northern New South Wales)

External links
Australian Faunal Directory
Zygaenid moths of Australia: a revision of the Australian Zygaenidae

Moths of Australia
calliceros
Moths described in 1926